The 2021 Portland Thorns FC season was the team's ninth season as a professional women's soccer team. Thorns FC plays in the National Women's Soccer League, the top tier of women's soccer in the United States.

Background 

The Thorns were semi-finalists in the 2020 NWSL Challenge Cup and champions of the 2020 NWSL Fall Series, which replaced the 2020 NWSL season as a result of the COVID-19 pandemic.

Abuse scandal 

Throughout the 2021 National Women's Soccer League season, allegations of abuse surfaced in multiple teams across the National Women's Soccer League in the United States. As a result, five out of the ten teams in the league had head coaches resign or be fired, with league commissioner Lisa Baird also resigning due to the scandal.

In late-September, The Athletic published an investigation into North Carolina Courage head coach Paul Riley, alleging that Riley had sexually coerced and verbally abused players on his teams, specifically during the time period between 2011 and 2015 (consisting of his time in WPS, WPSL, and NWSL). More than a dozen players from every team Riley had coached since 2010 spoke to the publication and two named players went on the record with allegations against him. In the article, Riley denied the allegations. The article also stated that NWSL failed to act on Riley's alleged abuses multiple times, including earlier in 2021 when the league declined to act on an offer from two of Riley's alleged victims to assist in investigating Riley's alleged abuses. Later that day, the Courage announced that Riley had been fired due to "very serious allegations of misconduct".

The Thorns released a statement the same day citing that some of the incidents occurred during Riley's two-year tenure as head coach of the Thorns in 2015 and discussing their reaction to the incidents at the time. The Thorns later claimed to have investigated the reports and allowed Riley's contact to expire as a result, but did not fire him, and later thanked Riley for his service and continued to praise his performances in the following years. Paulson also apologized for this course of action.

In the report by The Athletic, a former Thorns player who had raised complaints about Riley also said Thorns general manager Gavin Wilkinson complained to her about a newspaper story in 2014 regarding her sexuality and suggested to her that she should not publicly discuss her sexuality or Pride. Wilkinson initially disputed Shim's recollection, calling it "bullshit", then released another statement apologizing to Shim. The player's story was further corroborated by the reporter who wrote the story, who noted that a member of the club's communications staff had complained about the lack of advance notice about the story's publication, as well as for another story about the same player in 2018 after she had left the team. Another reporter who covered the team corroborated the reporter's account.

Also in September, former Sky Blue FC player Nadia Nadim accused management of forging her signature on a contract extension so they could trade her to the Thorns in early 2016.

Thorns and Timbers owner Merritt Paulson apologized in an open letter on October 4, but a number of Portland Thorns players released a statement two days later calling for Wilkinson to be suspended. On the day of the players' statement, Wilkinson, who was responsible for Riley's hire and the eventual non-retainment of Riley's services following the 2015 season, was put on administrative leave from his role as the Thorns general manager, though not from his roles as general manager and president of the co-owned Portland Timbers. That evening, players interrupted several matches to link arms in a circle in the center of a field to protest against abuse. The protest was repeated by players in several leagues outside the United States, such as the FA Women's Super League, in a gesture of solidarity.

Aftermath 
The club reinstated Wilkinson as Timbers and Thorns president of soccer in January 2022 following an internal business review; however, due to ongoing league, union, and federation investigations, no players could be interviewed, and the players association disavowed any connection between the internal review and other investigations.

Wilkinson and the Portland Timbers front office faced further accusations of misconduct in the face of abuse reports in February 2022, when Major League Soccer suspended Timbers player Andy Polo pending an investigation into allegations of domestic violence made by Polo's ex-partner. Police reports later indicated that Timbers employees were present when police arrived to investigate the initial call in May 2021, months before The Athletic's report on Paul Riley was published, but the team failed to report the incident to the league for nine months. Polo's ex-partner detailed the event on Peruvian television, and claimed she had been pressured into not filing charges against Polo. An MLS investigation in March 2022 claimed the Timbers did not pressure Polo's ex-partner nor intentionally conceal the incident or their involvement. Wilkinson claimed Diego Valeri opposed the decision to cut Polo, which Valeri denied as he was no longer with the Timbers at the time of Polo's release from the team.

Olivia Moultrie lawsuit 

In 2019, after signing deals with Wasserman Media Group and Nike, Inc., the family of 13-year-old professional soccer player Olivia Moultrie announced that Moultrie was moving from Canyon Country, California, to Portland, Oregon, to join the Portland Thorns FC developmental academy.

On May 4, 2021, with the support of the Thorns front office and players, Moultrie and her father K.C. sued the National Women's Soccer League over a rule preventing players under the age of 18 from signing with the league, claiming it violates antitrust law because Major League Soccer, the North American top-division men's league, did not prohibit such signings. On May 24, 2021, U.S. District Judge Karin J. Immergut issued a 14-day temporary restraining order against the league on the request of Moultrie's lawyers, stating that the league had not persented "any compelling procompetitive reasons" for the policy.

The league argued that as a single entity, it could not be anticompetitive. However, in the temporary restraining order, Immergut noted that the NWSL might not meet the legal standard for a single-entity organization, being instead a collection of independent teams competing for talent, and that the age rule therefore would violate section 1 of the Sherman Antitrust Act. If such a ruling became permanent, other league rules that relied on its single-entity structure could be similarly contested.

On May 29, 2021, the league delayed, and then denied, the Thorns's discovery claim to the right to sign Moultrie to an NWSL standard player agreement. This prevented the Thorns from signing her despite the court order, made her discovery rights available to other NWSL teams, and delayed any potential NWSL contract offer.

On June 6, 2021, OL Reign acquired the discovery rights to sign Moultrie to an NWSL contract, and subsequently traded them to the Thorns in exchange for a third-round pick in the 2022 NWSL Draft. This allowed the Thorns to extend a professional contract offer to Moultrie in compliance with the court's restraining order. According to Moultrie's attorney, the league claimed to be in the process of creating a special discovery process for young players.

On June 18, 2021, Immergut granted Moultrie a preliminary injunction allowing her to sign an NWSL contract, which the league stated that it would appeal to the United States Court of Appeals for the Ninth Circuit on the grounds that the league was negotiating a collective bargaining agreement with the NWSL Players Association that would codify an age rule negotiated with players.

On June 30, 2021, Moultrie officially signed a three-year professional contract with the NWSL to play for Portland Thorns FC. On July 30, 2021, Moultrie and her attorneys settled their lawsuit with the NWSL out of court, which allowed Moultrie to sign with the league but left the league's age rule otherwise prohibiting players under the age of 18 intact. The settlement also allowed any age rule eventually agreed upon in the league's collective bargaining agreement with the Players Association to make Moultrie ineligible again.

Aftermath 
Moultrie debuted for the Thorns as a professional on August 19, 2021, against the Houston Dash during the 2021 Women's International Champions Cup exhibition tournament. She scored her first professional goal during the match off a direct free kick. Moultrie would finish the 2021 NWSL season with nine appearances and an assist. In 2022, the league allowed 17-year-old Jaedyn Shaw to join the league in an exemption to the age rule similar to the one created for Moultrie's settlement. Shaw's rights were claimed by San Diego Wave FC, who signed her to a contract through 2023. Shaw started the season training with the Washington Spirit, who had attempted to sign her directly, but were denied by the league's discovery process.

Stadium and facilities 
Thorns FC continued to play and train in Providence Park, their home since the team's inaugural season in 2013. The team held its first preseason training at the Portland Timbers training facilities in Beaverton, Oregon, before resuming training at the stadium.

Team

Staff

Squad

Competitions

NWSL Challenge Cup 

In 2021, the Thorns competed in the cup's West Division during the group stage.

Group stage

West Division standings

Championship 

Portland Thorns FC won the right to host the final by finishing with the best record across both divisions. NWSL commissioner Lisa Baird wrote a letter to Oregon governor Kate Brown requesting an exemption from a ban on fan attendance due to the "extreme risk" designation for COVID-19 in Multnomah County at the time. Brown denied the request, prompting rumors that the league might seek an alternative venue. However, Brown then downgraded the county's status four days before the match on May 4, 2021, to "high risk", allowing the Thorns to make up to 15 percent of the venue's capacity available.

Regular season

Matches

Regular season standings

Results summary

Results by matchday

NWSL Playoffs 

In 2021, the NWSL expanded the single-elimination playoff field from four to six teams, and granted the top two teams in the regular-season standings a first-round bye. The Thorns finished first in the league to win the NWSL Shield and hosted the third-seeded Chicago Red Stars in the playoff semi-finals.

International Champions Cup 

The 2021 International Champions Cup Women's Tournament was a friendly tournament of women's association football matches. It was the third edition of the Women's International Champions Cup and took place in Portland, Oregon, United States, from August 18 to 21, 2021. Portland Thorns FC qualified as champions of the 2020 Fall Series and emerged the winners, defeating Olympique Lyonnais Féminin 1-0 in the final, while FC Barcelona Femení won the third-place match.

Bracket

Matches

Statistics

Appearances, scoring, and discipline 

Players with no appearances not included in the list. Players whose names are struck are no longer with the club. Numbers in parentheses in the Appearances column represent appearances as a substitute.

Clean sheets

Awards

NWSL annual awards 

Announced November 17, 2021

Best XI

Second XI

NWSL monthly awards

Team of the Month

NWSL weekly awards

Player of the Week

Save of the Week

Transactions

NWSL Draft 

Draft picks are not automatically signed to the team roster. The 2021 NWSL Draft was held on January 13, 2021.

Transfers in

Transfers out

References 

2021 National Women's Soccer League season
American soccer clubs 2021 season
Portland Thorns FC
Portland Thorns FC seasons
2021 in sports in Oregon